Jerome "Jerry" Selinger (July 17, 1935 -  June 16, 2017) was a Canadian football player who played for the Ottawa Rough Riders. He won the Grey Cup with them in 1960, 1968 and 1969. He played college football at St. Joseph's College in Indiana, winning a national title as a member of the Pumas' 1956 squad.

References

1935 births
2017 deaths
Canadian football offensive linemen
Players of Canadian football from Saskatchewan
Ottawa Rough Riders players
Saint Joseph's Pumas football players